Mercedes Villalba is a Scottish Labour politician who has been a Member of the Scottish Parliament (MSP) for North East Scotland since May 2021.

Background
Villalba is originally from Bristol, England.  She settled in Dundee and was a shop steward with the Universities and Colleges Union (UCU).

Political career
On 7 May 2021 she was unsuccessful as Labour's candidate for Dundee City West, but the following day was elected as a Member of the Scottish Parliament (MSP) through the North East Scotland list. She was appointed as Shadow Minister for Environment and Biodiversity in June 2021.

In 2022, she called for the Labour whip to be restored to Jeremy Corbyn after having it suspended for failing to retract his remarks in response to the EHRC report into anti-Semitism in the Labour Party as demanded by Keir Starmer and David Evans.

Political beliefs
She is an outspoken critic of the British royal family and has called for its abolition.

On 6 July 2021, Villalba submitted a motion to demand an end to the US embargo on Cuba.

References

External links 
 

Year of birth missing (living people)
Living people
Politicians from Bristol
Labour MSPs
Members of the Scottish Parliament 2021–2026
Female members of the Scottish Parliament
British republicans